Events in the year 1624 in Norway.

Incumbents
Monarch: Christian IV

Events
28 February – A decree made it explicitly illegal for Jesuits and monks to appear in the country, with death penalty as a consequence for offenders.
17-20 August – The great city fire of Oslo.
25 October – Det Norske Jernkompani is granted a royal privilege, granting the company almost a monopoly on iron production on an industrial scale within Norway.
Fall – Three woman were executed by decapitation at the Akershus witch trials.
The mining town of Kongsberg is founded.
Christian IV renames and moves Oslo after the great fire. He renames the city Christiania.

Arts and literature

Births

Deaths
7 February – Cort Aslakssøn, astronomer, theologist and philosopher (born 1564).

See also

References